Miguel Andrés Ponce Torres (born 19 August 1971) is a Chilean football manager and former player who played as a defender. He is the current manager of Deportes Iquique.

Honours

Club
Universidad Católica
 Primera División de Chile (1): 2005 Clausura

References

playerhistory
Nestor Clausen at Footballdatabase

1971 births
Living people
Footballers from Santiago
Chilean footballers
Chile international footballers
Association football defenders
Deportes Temuco footballers
Club Deportivo Universidad Católica footballers
Universidad de Chile footballers
Everton de Viña del Mar footballers
Chilean Primera División players
1997 Copa América players
Chilean football managers
Deportes La Serena managers
San Luis de Quillota managers
Unión San Felipe managers
Huachipato managers
Deportes Temuco managers
Club Blooming managers
Primera B de Chile managers
Chilean Primera División managers
Bolivian Primera División managers
C.D. Jorge Wilstermann managers
Chilean expatriate football managers
Chilean expatriate sportspeople in Bolivia
Expatriate football managers in Bolivia
Club San José managers
Deportes Iquique managers